Salted squid is squid or cuttlefish cured with dry salt and thus preserved for later consumption. Drying or salting, either with dry salt or with brine is a widely available method of seafood preservation. Salted squid is often mistaken with dried shredded squid, which is specifically shredded and seasoned dried squid. The salted squid production method is similar to salted fish and often considered as a specific variant of salted fish. Salted squid commonly found in coastal Asian countries, especially Indonesia, Malaysia, Thailand, Vietnam, Taiwan, Hong Kong, Southern China, South Korea and Japan.

Method
The squid meat is washed with dilute brine or seawater, to wash off contaminants on the surface. Draining is followed with salting. The salting process can be done in wet method — by soaking squids in brine solution, or in dry salting — by sprinkling salt upon squids. The process is followed by sun drying. In East Asian countries, such as Japan and China, dried salted squid are usually gutted and flattened prior to sun drying. In Indonesia however, dried salted squid are usually not gutted and remain in its cylindric form.

In cuisine

In Indonesia, dried salted squid is one of popular processed seafood available in traditional markets. Usually salted dried squid are washed and fried, either deep fried or stir fried, and consumed as a side dish with steamed rice. Stir fried cuttlefish might be cooked in green sambal chili paste.

See also
Brining
Cantonese salted fish
Cured fish
Ojingeo-jeot
Squid as food

Notes

Food preservation
Salted foods